The 28th Buil Film Awards ceremony was hosted by the Busan-based daily newspaper Busan Ilbo. It was held on October 4, 2019, at the Busan Dream Theatre in Busan and was emceed by presenter  and actress Lee In-hye.

Nominations and winners
Complete list of nominees and winners:

(Winners denoted in bold)

References

External links
 
28th Buil Film Awards at Daum 

2019 film awards
Buil Film Awards
2019 in South Korean cinema
October 2019 events in South Korea